Lightning Strikes Again is the tenth studio album by the American heavy metal band Dokken. It was originally scheduled for release on October 24, 2007, in Japan and on October 29 worldwide, but was postponed until 2008. The album was eventually released in the UK on April 8, 2008 and in the US on May 13.
The album entered the Billboard Top 200 at No. 133, the band's best chart performance since 2004. It received some of the best reviews since the band's classic era in the 1980s. The album title comes from a track from their 1985 album Under Lock and Key. The album is also the last to feature bassist Barry Sparks and drummer Mick Brown.

Track listing

Personnel

Dokken
Don Dokken – vocals, producer
Jon Levin – lead and rhythm guitars
Barry Sparks – bass guitar
Mick Brown – drums

Production
Tim David Kelly - co-producer, engineer
Wyn Davis - engineer, mixing, mastering, keyboards on "How I Miss Your Smile"
Chris Baseford, Mike Sutherland, Mike Lesniak, Mike Sheraton - engineers

Charts

References

Dokken albums
2008 albums
Rhino Records albums
Frontiers Records albums
King Records (Japan) albums